Michael Waginger (born October 11, 1979) is a German professional ice hockey player. He is currently playing for ERC Ingolstadt in the Deutsche Eishockey Liga (DEL).

References

External links

1979 births
Living people
ERC Ingolstadt players
German ice hockey forwards
People from Sonthofen
Sportspeople from Swabia (Bavaria)